New Cross railway station serves New Cross in south-east London, England. Platform D is used exclusively by London Overground services. Ticket barriers control access to all platforms.

History

In the early Victorian railway boom two companies constructed lines through the area. The London and Croydon Railway (L&CR) built a station on the New Cross Road close to Hatcham in 1839.

On 14 October 1844 a large fire that broke out in a paint shop destroyed carriage and engine sheds and workshops adjacent to the station. The fire was witnessed by Louis Philippe I, King of France who was travelling from the station to Dover.

On 30 July 1849 the South Eastern Railway (SER) opened a station at North Kent Junction when the North Kent line opened linking Strood with the London and Greenwich Railway route to London Bridge. This station proved inconvenient so a new station called New Cross & Naval School was opened by the SER in October 1850 located adjacent to the New Cross Road in the heart of New Cross. In 1854 the station was renamed New Cross. Accordingly, both the South Eastern Railway (SER) and the London Brighton & South Coast Railway had stations named New Cross which caused confusion until the two companies were absorbed under the 1923 grouping into the Southern Railway and the name of the older station was changed to New Cross Gate; the ex-South Eastern station remained New Cross.

On 7 December 1869 the East London Line opened serving the LBSCR New Cross station but it was not until 1 April 1880 that services (which started at Addiscombe and worked through to Liverpool Street) started operation via New Cross SER. Freight trains also operated via the East London Line and were hauled by Great Eastern Railway locomotives through to Hither Green Goods Yards. From 30 June 1911 East London Line passenger services south of New Cross ceased.

On 31 March 1913 electric passenger services operated by the Metropolitan Railway started operation from New Cross and worked through to Kensington Addison Road via Kings Cross.

After World War II and following nationalisation on 1 January 1948, the station was part of British Railways Southern Region.

The East London Line was closed to goods traffic in 1962.

In the 1950s and 1960s, London Underground planned a new line connecting north-west and south-east London. Approval for the first stage of the Fleet line (renamed the Jubilee line in 1975) to Charing Cross was granted in 1969, with second and third stages approved in 1971 and 1972. New Cross station was to be the penultimate station of phase 3 running to Lewisham. Southbound trains were to serve one of the existing platforms and northbound trains would have served a new platform in tunnel beneath the station. Although phases 2 and 3 were not carried out due to a lack of funds, a  section of the northbound tunnel was constructed near New Cross in 1972 to test new tunnelling techniques.

The station was rebuilt in the 1970s and the original station buildings on the road bridge were replaced in 1975 by a wooden building which opened in Amersham Vale. Platforms on the down and up fast lines were closed and demolished and a new track layout was introduced at this time in connection with the wider London Bridge re-signaling scheme.

In 1985, the present buildings in Amersham Vale opened.

Until 22 December 2007 London Underground used to serve this station as the southern terminus to their East London Line. This closed for major engineering work to convert the East London Line to standard 750 V third rail electrification. The line reopened on 27 April 2010 with services now operated by London Overground using  Capitalstar units.

Carriage Shed
A 6 siding carriage shed was located just north of the station. Built by the East London Railway the shed was leased by the Metropolitan Railway and continued in service until the line closed in 2007. When the line re-opened the new Capitalstar units were maintained at a new depot at New Cross Gate.

Services

The typical off-peak service in trains per hour is:
 6 tph to London Cannon Street
 2 tph to  via 
 2 tph to  via 
 2 tph to  via , continuing to London Cannon Street via Woolwich Arsenal and 
 4 tph to 

During the peak hours, the station is served by an additional half-hourly circular service to and from London Cannon Street via  in the clockwise direction and Woolwich Arsenal and Greenwich in the anticlockwise direction. 

Platform layout
Platform A is used by Southeastern trains to London Cannon Street
Platform B is a bi-directional platform used by Southeastern trains to London Cannon Street, Dartford, Hayes, Orpington etc.
Platform C is used by Southeastern trains to Dartford, Gravesend (evenings and Sunday), Hayes or Orpington
Platform D is used by London Overground trains to Dalston Junction or Highbury & Islington

Gallery

Connections
London Buses routes 53, 177, 225, 453 and night routes N53 and N89 serve the station.

Accidents
The Spa Road Junction rail crash occurred outside the station on 8 January 1999.

References

External links

Railway stations in the London Borough of Lewisham
Former South Eastern Railway (UK) stations
DfT Category C2 stations
Railway stations in Great Britain opened in 1850
Railway stations served by London Overground
Railway stations served by Southeastern
New Cross